Junction City is a census-designated place (CDP) in Trinity County, California. Its population is 658 as of the 2020 census, down from 680 from the 2010 census. The Trinity River runs through the town and heads northwest from there. The ZIP Code is 96048. The community is inside area code 530.

History
Junction City was established when a few cabins were built in the 1850s at the mouth of Canyon Creek, it was originally called "Milltown" due to the number of mills, but in 1861 it was officially named Junction City since it served as a junction for several transportation routes at Canyon Creek and Trinity River.

Junction City had the largest and most famous diversion dam.  The Arkansas Dam, was built in 1851, four miles upstream of Junction City. After the dam washed out in the winter of 1851 and again in 1852, it was rebuilt so substantially as to withstand not only the winter storms but also contain an upstream dam break flood that occurred when the 14-foot-high diversion dam at Union bar gave way.

The ensuing flood wiped out every water wheel, dam, and other structures along the river in the intervening 20 miles between the dams. In 1857, Arkansas dam was removed by the miners so they could reach the gold deposits beneath the dam.

In 1988, a Tibetan Buddhist temple, Rigdzin Ling, part of the Chagdud Gonpa Foundation founded by Chagdud Tulku Rinpoche.  

In the May 8th, 2005 the hotel burned down under mysterious circumstances. It was one of the last remaining buildings in Junction City from the 1800s.
In May 2006, the Junction Fire scorched , then later combined with the Bar Fire, making that . The Junction Fire threatened all of Junction City, and even some parts of the town of Weaverville.

On July 20, 2008 fire threatened communities near Junction City; some areas were under mandatory evacuation. Many huge forest fires broke out because of a lightning storm which occurred on June 20, 2008 in Northern California.

Education
Public schools are run or overseen by the Junction City Elementary School District, which consists of one elementary school and they follow by a single track schedule, with school starting in late August or early September and concludes in June. The only school is a K-8 school listed below. 
Junction City Elementary School

Geography
According to the United States Census Bureau, the CDP covers an area of 27.9 square miles (72.4 km2), 99.84% of it land and 0.16% of it water.

Transportation

Major highways
 State Route 299. State route 299 runs through the middle of Junction City. This is part of SR 299 that is between Arcata and Redding is the Trinity Scenic Byway, a National Forest Scenic Byway.

Parks and Trails
Junction City Park

Demographics

Population

2010 Census
The 2010 United States Census reported that Junction City had a population of 680. The population density was 24.3 people per square mile (9.4/km2). The racial makeup of Junction City was 597 (87.8%) White, 1 (0.1%) African American, 29 (4.3%) Native American, 2 (0.3%) Asian, 0 (0.0%) Pacific Islander, 20 (2.9%) from other races, and 31 (4.6%) from two or more races.  Hispanic or Latino of any race were 49 persons (7.2%).

The Census reported that 659 people (96.9% of the population) lived in households, 21 (3.1%) lived in non-institutionalized group quarters, and 0 (0%) were institutionalized.

There were 293 households, out of which 61 (20.8%) had children under the age of 18 living in them, 150 (51.2%) were opposite-sex married couples living together, 23 (7.8%) had a female householder with no husband present, 14 (4.8%) had a male householder with no wife present.  There were 24 (8.2%) unmarried opposite-sex partnerships, and 0 (0%) same-sex married couples or partnerships. 86 households (29.4%) were made up of individuals, and 26 (8.9%) had someone living alone who was 65 years of age or older. The average household size was 2.25.  There were 187 families (63.8% of all households); the average family size was 2.71.

The population was spread out, with 110 people (16.2%) under the age of 18, 36 people (5.3%) aged 18 to 24, 119 people (17.5%) aged 25 to 44, 261 people (38.4%) aged 45 to 64, and 154 people (22.6%) who were 65 years of age or older.  The median age was 52.3 years. For every 100 females, there were 100.6 males.  For every 100 females age 18 and over, there were 101.4 males.

There were 361 housing units at an average density of 12.9 per square mile (5.0/km2), of which 236 (80.5%) were owner-occupied, and 57 (19.5%) were occupied by renters. The homeowner vacancy rate was 2.5%; the rental vacancy rate was 4.6%.  536 people (78.8% of the population) lived in owner-occupied housing units and 123 people (18.1%) lived in rental housing units.

Politics

Historical Markers
There is one historical marker in Junction City to commemorate its centennial.  It is located next to the Junction City store.

See also
Trinity County, California

References

Census-designated places in Trinity County, California
Census-designated places in California
1850s establishments in California
Populated places established in the 1850s